The Garner Wynn Green House is a historic mansion in Jackson, Mississippi, U.S.. It was built in 1910 for Garner Wynn Green, an attorney whose ancestors were the co-founders of the city of Jackson. It was designed in the Classical Revival style by architect Emmett J. Hull. It has been listed on the National Register of Historic Places since October 31, 1985.

References

Houses on the National Register of Historic Places in Mississippi
Neoclassical architecture in Mississippi
Houses completed in 1910
Houses in Jackson, Mississippi